Hornblende Lake is a lake in Thunder Bay District, Ontario, Canada. The primary inflow is the Whitesand River flowing downstream from Longcanoe Lake, and the primary outflow is also the Whitesand River, which flows downstream into Lyne Lake.

References

Lakes of Thunder Bay District